Severin Worm-Petersen (2 June 1857 – 30 December 1933) was a Norwegian photographer.

Biography
He learned photography in 1876, at age 19, as an apprentice to John Lindegaard (1830–1889). In 1877 he started his own studio for portrait photography. In 1881 he photographed the unveiling of Brynjulf Bergslien's monument to Henrik Wergeland.

References

External links
Severin Worm-Petersen at the National Archival Services of Norway

19th-century Norwegian photographers
1933 deaths
1857 births